KAI RQ-101 Night Intruder is a military UAV of the South-Korean armed forces. It is the first Korean in-house development in the field of unmanned aerial technology. The manufacturer is Korea Aerospace Industries (KAI).

As early as the 1990s, the South Korean armed forces used the first drones from Israel. Among other things, the Searcher II was used, which is said to have represented the basis for the Korean in-house development. Officially, it is not known how many RQ-101s are in service with the South Korean Army. According to public sources, there were several dozen in 2017.

The RQ-101 has a wingspan of 6.4 meters and a total length of 4.6 meters. The engine of unknown brand accelerates the propeller-driven device to 185 km/h and a cruising speed of 150 km/h. The maximum altitude is about 4000 m. The drone can stay in the air for about six hours and cover a radius of 80 kilometers. Unloaded, the drone weighs 215 kg, according to the manufacturer.

The drone can be equipped with various sensors. By default, the aircraft has an HD video camera that can send live images.

–Wing Span 6.4 m (21 ft) 
–Aspect Ratio 9.18
–Maximum Level Speed 185 km/h (100 kt) 
–Length Overall 4.7 m (15 ft) 
–Cruising Speed 120–150 km/h (65–81 kt) 
–Maximum Takeoff Weight 290 kg (640 lb) 
–Maximum Payload 45 kg (99 lb) 
–Ceiling 4.57 km (15,000 ft) 
–Power Plant 1 X 50 hp rotary over 120 km 
–Operational Radius over 200 km (108 nm) 
–Maximum Endurance 6.0h

References 

Twin-boom aircraft
KAI aircraft
Medium-altitude long-endurance unmanned aerial vehicles
Single-engined pusher aircraft